The African Union is governed by organs per Article 5 of the Constitutive Act of the African Union.

List

Assembly of the Union

Executive Council

Pan-African Parliament

Court of Justice

Commission

Permanent Representatives Committee

Specialized Technical Committees

ECOSOCC

Financial Institutions

Peace and Security Council

References